Shi Tingmao (born 31 August 1991) is a Chinese diver representing Chongqing diving team. She has been dominant in the 3 metre springboard events in the 2010s. She has won four gold medals in Olympic competitions, two at the 2016 Olympics and two more at the 2020 Olympics. She also holds eight golds in the World Championships.

Career
She won the gold medal in women's 1m springboard at the 2011 World Aquatics Championships in Shanghai, becoming the first Chinese diver from provincial team to participate the World Championships.

At the 2016 Summer Olympics she won the gold medal in women's 3 metre synchronized springboard with Wu Minxia. She also won gold in the 3m Springboard.

At the 2019 World Aquatics Championships held in Gwangju, South Korea, Shi won her third consecutive World Championships gold in the 3m springboard event.  She also won gold in the 3m synchro with partner Wang Han.

At the 2020 Summer Olympics, celebrated in 2021, she repeated the 2016 success and won the gold medal in women's 3 metre synchronized springboard with Wang Han. She also won again the gold medal in the 3m Springboard.

Accolades
Shi was named the Best Female Diver of the Year by FINA in six consecutive years from 2015 to 2021.

Personal life 
After gold-winning in the 2020 Summer Olympics she revealed that she was struggling with depression and considered abandoning professional diving. Shi joined Naomi Osaka and Simone Biles in openly talking about mental health issues in women's elite competitions.

Major achievements

 2008 National Diving Championships –  3rd 3m Springboard
 2009 National Diving Championships –  3rd 1m Springboard
 2009 National Games –  3rd 1m Springboard; 4th 3m Springboard
 2010 National Diving Championships –  2nd 1m springboard
 2010 Asian Games –  1st 3m Synchronized Springboard;  2nd 3m Springboard
 2011 World Aquatics Championships –  1st 1m Springboard
 2013 World Aquatics Championships –  1st 3m Synchro Springboard (with Wu Minxia)
 2014 Asian Games –  1st 1m Springboard;  1st 3m Synchronized Springboard
 2015 World Aquatics Championships –  1st 3m Synchro Springboard (with Wu Minxia)
 2015 World Aquatics Championships –  1st 3m Springboard 
 2015 World Aquatics Championships –  2nd 1m Springboard
 2016 Summer Olympics –  1st 3m Synchro Springboard (with Wu Minxia)
 2016 Summer Olympics –  1st 3m Springboard
 2017 World Aquatics Championships –  1st 3m Synchro Springboard (with Chang Yani)
 2017 World Aquatics Championships –  1st 3m Springboard
 2018 Asian Games –  1st 3m Women's Springboard
 2020 Summer Olympics –  1st 3m Synchro Springboard (with Wang Han)
 2020 Summer Olympics –  1st 3m Springboard

References

External links

1991 births
Living people
Sportspeople from Chongqing
Chinese female divers
Asian Games medalists in diving
Asian Games gold medalists for China
Asian Games silver medalists for China
Divers at the 2010 Asian Games
Divers at the 2014 Asian Games
Divers at the 2018 Asian Games
Olympic divers of China
Olympic medalists in diving
Divers at the 2016 Summer Olympics
2016 Olympic gold medalists for China
World Aquatics Championships medalists in diving
Medalists at the 2010 Asian Games
Medalists at the 2014 Asian Games
Medalists at the 2018 Asian Games
Universiade medalists in diving
Universiade gold medalists for China
Medalists at the 2011 Summer Universiade
Olympic gold medalists for China
Divers at the 2020 Summer Olympics
Medalists at the 2020 Summer Olympics
21st-century Chinese women